Hypsirhynchus polylepis, the Jamaican long-tailed racer or Jamaican long-tailed ground snake, is a species of snake in the family Colubridae.  The species is native to Jamaica.

References

Hypsirhynchus
Reptiles of Jamaica
Endemic fauna of Jamaica
Reptiles described in 1966